The 2017–18 1st Division is the 2017-18 season of the highest division and second-highest handball league in the Danish league system. The winner of 1st division is granted direct promotion to the league. Ajax København were the winners of the 2016-17 season.

Team information

Standings

Top scorers
.

Number of teams by regions

See also
 Handball
 Danish Men's Handball League
 Danish Women's Handball League

References

Women's handball in Denmark
Women's handball leagues
Professional sports leagues in Denmark
Women's sports leagues in Denmark
2017 in Danish sport
2018 in Danish women's sport
2017 in Danish women's sport
2018 in Danish sport